For the purposes of this article, heraldry societies are defined as private associations of people who are interested in heraldry. Heraldic authorities, which have been established by reigning monarchs or governments, are dealt with in a separate article.

International
 Academie Internationale d'Heraldique (1949- )
 International Association of Amateur Heralds (1999- ) - it exists only in cyberspace, where it hosts an active internet forum and Facebook group 
The International Heraldry Society 
The Society of Heraldic Arts, an international guild of heraldic artists and craftspeople. 
The Armorial Register

Europe

Belgium

 Royal Belgian Genealogical and Heraldic Office (1942) - it publishes a bimonthly review (Le Parchemin), a quarterly link sheet (Le Herault) and studies in Les Recueils.

Bulgaria
 Bulgarian Heraldry and Vexillology Society

Denmark
 Dansk Heraldisk Selskab (Danish Heraldry Socoety), affiliated with Societas Heraldica Scandinavica.

England

 The Heraldry Society (1947- ) - it publishes a newsletter (Heraldry Gazette) and a journal (The Coat of Arms).
 Cambridge University Heraldic and Genealogical Society (1950- ) - it publishes a journal (The Escutcheon).
 Middlesex Heraldry Society (1976- ) - it publishes a newsletter (The Seaxe).
 Oxford University Heraldry Society (founded 1835, but fell into desuetude in the 1930s), at least two attempts to be revived.
 White Lion Society (1986- )
 Norfolk Heraldry Society - The Norfolk Standard is published three times a year.
 Suffolk Heraldry Society - The magazine of the Society, The Blazon, is published bi-annually.
Institute of Heraldic and Genealogical Studies

Finland
 Suomen heraldinen seura (Heraldry Society of Finland, 1957–)

France
 Société française d'héraldique et de sigillographie (1937-)

Germany
 HEROLD, Verein für Heraldik, Genealogie und verwandte Wissenschaften zu Berlin e. V. (1869 -). Oldest continuously working Heraldry society in the world.
 Heraldischer Verein 'Zum Kleeblatt' (1888- )
 »Der Wappen-Löwe« – Heraldische Gesellschaft e. V. (1980 - )

Macedonia
 Macedonian Heraldry Society (2003- ) http://heraldika.org.mk/en/

Netherlands
 Koninklijk Nederlandsch Gennotschap voor Geslacht- en Wapenkunde (1883- ) - it publishes a journal (De Nederlandsche Leeuw).
 Nederlands Genootschap voor Heraldiek, NGH (Dutch Heraldry Society) (2014-) - it publishes a journal (Blazoen) and has three registers for coats of arms: personal/family, ecclesiastical and other organisations.

The Nordic countries (Denmark, Finland, Iceland, Norway and Sweden)
 Societas Heraldica Scandinavica (1959- ) - it publishes a journal (Heraldisk Tidsskrift), a roll of arms (Skandinavisk vapenrulla) and a newsletter.

Norway
 Norwegian Heraldry Society (1969- ) - it publishes a journal (Våpenbrevet).

Scotland
 Heraldry Society of Scotland (1977- ) - it publishes a newsletter (Tak Tent) and a journal (The Double Tressure), and hosts an active internet forum.

Serbia
 Serbian Heraldry Society (1991- ) http://srpskoheraldickodrustvo.com/ 
 CROM - Board for Heraldic and Genealogical Studies (2001- )

Slovenia
 Heraldica Slovenica (1991- ) http://www.heraldica-slovenica.si/

Sweden
 Swedish Heraldry Society (1976- ) - it publishes a journal (Vapenbilden).

Switzerland
 Société Suisse d'Héraldique - Schweizerisches Heraldische Gesellschaft (1891- )

Ukraine
 Ukrainian Heraldry Society (1990-)

Africa
General:
 Heraldry Society of Africa - it lists a general index of African coats of arms (recognized by the Republic of Uganda/UN)
South Africa
 Heraldry Society of Southern Africa (1953- ) - it publishes a journal (Arma).
Zimbabwe
 Heraldry & Genealogy Society of Zimbabwe (1970- )

North America

Canada
 Royal Heraldry Society of Canada (1966- ) - it publishes a newsletter (Gonfanon) and two journals (Heraldry in Canada and Alta Studia Heraldica) and hosts an internet forum.
United States of America
 Committee on Heraldry of the New England Historic Genealogical Society (1864)
American College of Heraldry (1972- )
 College of Arms Foundation (1984- )
 American Heraldry Society (2003- ) - it publishes a newsletter (The Courant) and a journal (The American Herald), and hosts an internet forum.
 Society of Scottish Armigers
 Augustan Society

Oceania

Australia
 Australian Heraldry Society (1961- ) - it publishes a journal (Heraldry News).
 Heraldry & Genealogy Society of Canberra - it publishes a journal (The Ancestral Searcher).

New Zealand
 The Heraldry Society of New Zealand (1962- )

Asia
Philippines
 Philippine Armorial (2017- ) - provides a register of personal and family coats of arms in the Philippines and of Filipinos abroad.

References